The Throne Verse (Ayat Al-Kursi) is the 255th verse of the 2nd chapter of the Quran, Al-Baqarah (Q2:255). The verse speaks about how nothing and nobody is regarded to be comparable to Allah.

This is one of the best-known verses of the Quran and is widely memorised and displayed in the Muslim world. It is often recited to ward off jinn.

Text and meaning

The verse consists of ten complete Arabic sentences.

Text

Romanizations
Hafs from Aasim ibn Abi al-Najud

²⁵⁵ 

Warsh from Nafiʽ al-Madani

 

²⁵⁴

Meaning
255 Allah! La ilaha illa Huwa (none has the right to be worshipped but He), the Ever Living, the One Who sustains and protects all that exists. Neither slumber, nor sleep overtake Him. To Him belongs whatever is in the heavens and whatever is on earth. Who is he that can intercede with Him except with His Permission? He knows what happens to them (His creatures) in this world, and what will happen to them in the Hereafter. And they will never encompass anything of His Knowledge except of that which He wills. His Throne extends over the heavens and the earth, and He feels no fatigue in guarding and preserving them. And He is the Most High, the Most Great.

255  – there is no deity except Him, the Ever-Living, the Sustainer of [all] existence. Neither drowsiness overtakes Him nor sleep. To Him belongs whatever is in the heavens and whatever is on the earth. Who is it that can intercede with Him except by His permission? He knows what is [presently] before them and what will be after them, and they encompass not a thing of His knowledge except for what He wills. His  extends over the heavens and the earth, and their preservation tires Him not. And He is the Most High, the Most Great.

255 Allah! there is no God but He the living the Self-subsisting Eternal. No slumber can seize him nor sleep. His are all things in the heavens and on earth. Who is there can intercede in His presence except as He permitteth? He knoweth what (appeareth to his creatures as) before or after or behind them. Nor shall they compass aught of his knowledge except as He willeth. His throne doth extend over the heavens and the earth and He feeleth no fatigue in guarding and preserving them. For He is the Most High the Supreme (in glory).

255 Allah! There is no God save Him, the Alive, the Eternal. Neither slumber nor sleep overtaketh Him. Unto Him belongeth whatsoever is in the heavens and whatsoever is in the earth. Who is he that intercedeth with Him save by His leave? He knoweth that which is in front of them and that which is behind them, while they encompass nothing of His knowledge save what He will. His Throne includeth the heavens and the earth, and He is never weary of preserving them. He is the Sublime, the Tremendous.

Traditions
Ayat al-Kursi is regarded as the greatest verse of Quran according to hadith. The verse is regarded as one of the most powerful in the Quran because when it is recited, the greatness of God is believed to be confirmed. The person who recites this ayah morning and evening will be under protection of God from the evil of the jinn and the shayatin (devils); this is also known as the daily adkhar. It is used in exorcism, to cure and protect from jinn and shayatin. Because the Throne Verse is believed to grant spiritual or physical protection, it is often recited by Muslims before setting out on a journey and before going to sleep. Reciting the verse after every prayer is believed to grant entry to paradise.

Gallery

See also

Notes

References

External Links 
 Chapter of Heifer 1-286 | Quran.Com
 Ayat Al-kursi

Quranic verses
Islamic theology
Exorcism in Islam
Allah
Al-Baqara